The  was one of the shinnōke, branches of the Imperial Family of Japan which were, until 1947, eligible to succeed to the Chrysanthemum Throne in the event that the main line should die out.

History
The Arisugawa-no-miya house was founded by Prince Yoshihito, seventh son of Emperor Go-Yōzei (d. 1638), and was originally named Takamatsu-no-miya. The house changed its name to Arisugawa-no-miya after its second head, Prince Nagahito was elevated to the throne as Emperor Go-Sai.

The Arisugawa-no-miya house traditionally served as instructors in calligraphy and waka composition to successive generations of Emperors. After the Meiji Restoration in 1868, when Emperor Meiji was restored, his uncle, Prince Arisugawa Taruhito (1835–1895), became commander-in-chief, and in 1875 Chancellor of the Realm. After his suppression of the Satsuma Rebellion in 1875 he was made a field-marshal, and he was again commander-in-chief in the First Sino-Japanese War. His younger brother, Prince Arisugawa Takehito (1862–1913), was from 1879 to 1882 attached to the British navy, as a military attaché and later as a cadet. He went on to command positions in the Japanese Navy, and represented Japan in formal visits to England.

The Arisugawa line ended early in the twentieth century when no male heirs remained. However, the Imperial Household Agency revived the original title of Takamatsu-no-miya for the third son of Emperor Taishō. The line again became extinct on Prince Takamatsu Nobuhito’s death, as he had no children.

In 2003, an impostor to the Arisugawa line appeared, and stole a great deal of money.

Dynasty

※In Imperial Household Law at that time, an Imperial prince was not taken from his birth family by the adopted family. Prince Nobuhito re-founded the Takamatsu-no-miya. Therefore, Prince Nobuhito was not considered the eleventh generation Takamatsu-no-miya but the first generation of the second Takamatsu-no-miya.

References
 Keene, Donald. Emperor Of Japan: Meiji And His World, 1852-1912. Columbia University Press (2005). 
 Lebra, Sugiyama Takie. Above the Clouds: Status Culture of the Modern Japanese Nobility. University of California Press (1995).

Notes

External links
 link to digitized images of Taruhito-shinnō (1871-1895) and Takehito-shinnō (1895-1913)
 link to 2006 news story: wrongful claims of Arisugawa descent are criminal fraud

 
Japanese nobility